Egon Gustaf Martin Wiberg (born 3 June 1901 in Güstrow; died 24 November 1976 in Munich) was a German chemist and professor for inorganic chemistry at the Ludwig Maximilian University of Munich.

Life 
Wiberg studied chemistry at the Technical University of Karlsruhe (TH Karlsruhe) since 1921 and completed his doctorate in 1927. He was an academic student of Stefan Goldschmidt and wrote his doctoral thesis on "Über den Abbau von Aminosäuren und Dipeptiden durch Hypobromit" ("On the degradation of amino acids and dipeptides by hypobromite"). In 1931 he completed his habilitation at the TH Karlsruhe. In 1936 he became an unscheduled professor at the TH Karlsruhe and in 1938 provisional head of the Extraordinariat (apl. Prof.) for Inorganic Chemistry at the Ludwig Maximilian University of Munich. Since 1943 he was co-editor of the "Lehrbuch der Chemie", founded by Arnold F. Holleman, which was published in 1955 as "Lehrbuch der Inorganischen Chemie". In 1951 he became a full professor and director of the Institute of Inorganic Chemistry at the Ludwig Maximilian University in Munich.

Research 
The fields of work were hydrides of the chemical elements beryllium, magnesium, boron, aluminium and other metals as well as phosphorus, boron, silicon and boron nitrogen compounds.

Awards 
 Alfred Stock Memorial Prize (1950)
 Member of the Bavarian Academy of Sciences and Humanities (1952)
 Member of the Academy of Sciences Leopoldina (1959)
 Honorary doctorate Dr. rer. nat. h. c. of the TH Aachen
 Honorary doctorate of the Technische Hochschule Wien (1965)
 Bavarian Order of Merit

A lecture series is named after him.

Selected publications

References 

1901 births
1976 deaths
20th-century German chemists
Karlsruhe Institute of Technology alumni
Academic staff of the Ludwig Maximilian University of Munich
Presidents of the German Chemical Society